The Sri Lanka cricket team toured India in January 2020 to play three Twenty20 International (T20I) matches. Originally, Zimbabwe were scheduled to tour India. However, on 25 September 2019, the Board of Control for Cricket in India (BCCI) cancelled the Zimbabwe series following the International Cricket Council's (ICC) suspension of Zimbabwe Cricket. Sri Lanka were confirmed as their replacement for the tour. All of the formats, venues and dates remained the same. India won the series 3–0.

Squads

T20I series

1st T20I

2nd T20I

3rd T20I

Statistics

Most runs

Most wickets

Sri Lankan cricket team in Zimbabwe in 2019-20

References

External links
 Series home at ESPN Cricinfo

2020 in Indian cricket
2020 in Sri Lankan cricket
International cricket competitions in 2019–20
Sri Lankan cricket tours of India